The Thompson-Hansen House is a historic residence in Brigham City, Utah, United States, that is listed on the National Register of Historic Places.

Description
 
The house, which was built around 1860, is located at 120 North Main Street (SR-13). It is a one-and-a-half-story house, whose original, center section was started as an adobe house and later painted to appear as a brick house. Two cross-wings were added around 1880.

The original section was built by or for George Gilbert (1816-1908) and his wife Mary Blackwell Gilbert (1813-1887) who were born in Cornwall, England, and who immigrated with their daughter and three sons in the mid-1850s.

The house was listed on the National Register of Historic Places on December 23, 1994.

See also

 National Register of Historic Places listings in Box Elder County, Utah

References

External links

National Register of Historic Places in Box Elder County, Utah
Gothic Revival architecture in Utah
Houses completed in 1860